The Last Five Years is a musical written by Jason Robert Brown. It premiered at Chicago's Northlight Theatre in 2001 and was then produced Off-Broadway in March 2002. Since then it has had numerous productions both in the United States and internationally.

The story explores a five-year relationship between Jamie Wellerstein, a rising novelist, and Cathy Hiatt, a struggling actress. The show uses a form of storytelling in which Jamie's story is told in chronological order (starting just after the couple have first met) and Cathy's story is told in reverse chronological order (beginning the show at the end of the marriage). The characters do not directly interact except for a wedding song in the middle as their timelines intersect.

Background
The Last Five Years was inspired by Brown's failed marriage to Theresa O'Neill. O'Neill sued Brown on the grounds that the story of the musical violated non-disparagement and non-disclosure agreements within their divorce decree by representing her relationship with Brown too closely.  Brown, in turn, sued O’Neill for interfering with his creative work and his creative process. As part of the legal settlement for both suits, Brown removed all references to the character being Irish Catholic, and changed the song "I Could Be in Love With Someone Like You" to "Shiksa Goddess" in order to reduce the similarity between the character, Cathy, and O'Neill.

Synopsis
Cathy is sitting alone lamenting the end of her marriage ("Still Hurting"). We shift to meet Jamie. It is five years earlier and he has just met Cathy. Jamie is overjoyed to be dating outside his Jewish heritage ("Shiksa Goddess").

Cathy and Jamie are in Ohio but not together. It is her birthday and he has come to visit her as she works in a show there ("See I'm Smiling"). She is anxious to fix any problems in their marriage but she becomes angry when Jamie tells her he has to go back early to New York. During breaks in the music, we see a younger Jamie, talking to a literary agent about his book.

Jamie is moving in with Cathy. He comments on how lucky he is that everything is going right for him; his book is being published and his life with Cathy seems too good to be true ("Moving Too Fast"). Elsewhere an older Cathy is making a call to her agent: it seems her career isn't going the way she planned it.

Cathy is attending Jamie's book party. She sings about how he ignores her for his writing but she will always be in love with him ("I'm a Part of That").

Jamie and Cathy celebrate their second Christmas. He tells her a new story he has written about an old tailor named Schmuel and he gives her a Christmas present: a watch, promising to support her as she follows her dreams of acting. ("The Schmuel Song").

Cathy is in Ohio and writing to Jamie. She describes to Jamie her disappointing life in Ohio among her eccentric colleagues ("A Summer in Ohio").

Jamie is sitting with Cathy in Central Park. Jamie proposes to her and, for the first time in the musical, they sing together ("The Next Ten Minutes"). They get married, exchanging vows to stay together forever.

Jamie is facing temptation from other women, especially now his career as a writer has escalated ("A Miracle Would Happen"). Cathy, meanwhile, is auditioning for a role ("When You Come Home to Me"). She is getting down about the rejection she faces as an actress and complains to Jamie ("Climbing Uphill").

Jamie speaks to Cathy on the phone, trying to convince her that there is nothing going on with him and his editor, Elise. He wants to celebrate a book review but Cathy refuses to go out.

Jamie is fighting with Cathy, trying to get her to listen to him. He accuses her of being unsupportive of his career just because hers is failing. Though his words are harsh, he promises her that he believes in her ("If I Didn't Believe in You").

A younger Cathy is in the car with Jamie, who is going to meet her parents. She tells him about her past relationships and hopes not to end up in a small town life like her friend from high school ("I Can Do Better Than That"). She asks Jamie to move in with her.

Near the end of the relationship Jamie wakes up beside another woman ("Nobody Needs to Know"). He tries to defend his actions and blames Cathy for destroying his privacy and their relationship. Jamie promises not to lie to this woman and tells her that "I could be in love with someone like you," just as he does to Cathy in "Shiksa Goddess."

Cathy is ecstatic after her first date with Jamie. She sings goodbye ("Goodbye Until Tomorrow"). She proclaims that she has been waiting for Jamie her whole life. Simultaneously but five years forward, Jamie sits in their shared apartment writing laments over the relationship ("I Could Never Rescue You"). As Cathy waves Jamie "goodbye until tomorrow", Jamie wishes Cathy simply "goodbye".

Music

The musical style draws on a number of musical genres, including pop, jazz, classical, Klezmer, Latin, Blues, Rock, and Folk. The orchestration consists of piano, acoustic guitar, fretless bass, two cellos, one doubling on celesta and tubular bell, and violin, doubling cymbal.

 "Still Hurting" - Cathy

 "Shiksa Goddess" - Jamie
 "See I'm Smiling" - Cathy
 "Moving Too Fast" - Jamie
 "A Part of That" - Cathy
 "The Schmuel Song" - Jamie
 "A Summer in Ohio" - Cathy
 "The Next Ten Minutes" - Jamie & Cathy
 "A Miracle Would Happen/When You Come Home to Me" - Jamie/Cathy
 "Climbing Uphill/Audition Sequence" - Cathy
 "If I Didn't Believe in You" - Jamie
 "I Can Do Better Than That" - Cathy
 "Nobody Needs to Know" - Jamie
 "Goodbye Until Tomorrow/I Could Never Rescue You" - Jamie & Cathy

Cast album
The Last Five Years cast album was released by Sh-K-Boom Records in April 2002.

Original casts

Production history

Chicago (2001)
The show debuted at Northlight Theatre in Skokie, Illinois, in 2001, running from May 23 – July 1. The production starred Lauren Kennedy as Cathy and Norbert Leo Butz as Jamie.

Off-Broadway (2002)
The show opened Off-Broadway at the Minetta Theatre on March 2, 2002, and closed May 5, 2002, directed by Daisy Prince, with Butz again starring alongside Sherie Rene Scott. (Kennedy was unable to reprise her role due to taking a role in South Pacific in London.) The production won the 2002 Drama Desk Award for Outstanding Music and Lyrics, as well as receiving Drama Desk nominations for Outstanding Musical, Outstanding Actor, Outstanding Actress, Outstanding Orchestrations, and Outstanding Set Design. It also received the Lucille Lortel Award nomination for Outstanding Musical and Outstanding Actor, and the Outer Critics Circle Award nomination for Outstanding Off-Broadway Musical.

Off-Broadway revival (2013)
The show was revived in 2013 Off-Broadway at the Second Stage Theater for a limited engagement with Adam Kantor and Betsy Wolfe in the roles of Jamie and Cathy, respectively. Brown himself directed. In March 2015, Kantor and Wolfe reprised their roles in a two-night-only concert production of the show at the American Conservatory Theater in San Francisco.

Off-West End (2016) 

The 2016 production was headlined by Jonathan Bailey as Jamie and Samantha Barks as Cathy at St. James Theatre, with direction by Brown himself. The Stages Mark Shenton called the production "poignant" turning "each song into a masterclass of storytelling" with Bailey "a real vocal surprise with his haunting renditions of 'If I Didn’t Believe in You' and 'Nobody Needs to Know'." Edward Seckerson of The Arts Desk called the production a "knockout" and a "two-handed tour-de-force" in his five-star review.

It won the WhatsOnStage Award for Best Off-West End Production in 2017. A video of Bailey's audition singing "If I Didn't Believe In You" was uploaded on YouTube in 2017, and has since gone viral.

Others

 The show made its Asian premiere in Hong Kong at the Fringe Theatre in 2006. It starred Ron Pigate as Jamie and Kitty Cortes as Cathy. The production was directed by Elissa Rosati with musical direction by Amuer Calderon.
 The show premiered in Paris, France, in 2013 presented by American Musical Theatre Live featuring Jonathan Wagner as Jamie and Miranda Crispin as Cathy.
 The show was given its Northern Irish premiere at The Lyric Theatre, Belfast in 2015, running for a limited engagement. It starred Fra Fee as Jamie and Amy Lennox as Cathy. The production was directed by Stephen Whitson.
 The show premiered in Stockholm, Sweden, at Teaterstudio Lederman in April 2018. It starred Emil Nyström as Jamie and Cilla Silvia as Cathy. The production was directed by Robin Karlsson, with music direction by Johan Mörk.
 The show premiered in Basel, Switzerland, presented by Boutique Theatre Basel in June 2019. It starred Anthony Hehir as Jamie and Sarah Madeleine as Cathy. The production was directed by Susan Brownfield and choreographed by Gara Roda.

 On September 12, 2016, Jason Robert Brown, along with SubCulture, presented a one-night-only benefit for the Brady Center to prevent gun violence. The Town Hall in New York City hosted this event. Cynthia Erivo played Cathy, and Joshua Henry played Jamie. Jason Robert Brown conducted the orchestra.
 In June 2019, the musical was directed by Jason Alexander in a production in Syracuse, New York. Alexander introduced two dancers who shadow the characters of Jamie and Cathy; reviewer Linda Lowen wrote, "With approval from Brown, Alexander's vision has resulted in a production more interactive, more compelling, more visual, and more suited to those twenty-something millennials who -- like Jamie and Cathy -- grapple with love, career, independence and commitment."
 An actor-musician production opened in February 2020 to mixed reviews and transferred for a four week run at the Garrick.
 The Iceland premiére took place in Harpa, the concert house in Reykjavík on January 23, 2021. The Icelandic translation was made by Jóhann Axel Andersen. The production was independently produced by actress Viktoría Sigurðardóttir, who also played the role of Cathy. Rúnar Kristinn Rúnarsson played Jamie. The music director was Sigurður Halldórsson and Director was Vala Kristín Eiríksdóttir. The production was then taken to Hof in Akureyri and after that to Tjarnarbíó in Reykjavík in September 2021.
 In April 2021, a streamed production of the show was staged by Out of the Box Theatrics. The staging was unique as it took place entirely in an actual New York City apartment. The production starred Nicholas Edwards (Frozen, the social distanced Berkshire Theatre Group production of Godspell) and Nasia Thomas (Ain't Too Proud, Beautiful: The Carole King Musical) and was directed and featured musical direction by Jason Michael Webb (Choir Boy), and featured mainly Black musicians, who were often featured on screen with the actors.
 A 20th anniversary concert with Norbert Leo Butz and Lauren Kennedy accompanied by Jason Robert Brown took place in May 2021, online via YouTube.
 In autumn 2022, the original English version of the musical opened in Freiburg im Breisgau (Germany) starring Gabriela Ryffel and Calum Melville. The production was directed by Natalia Voskoboynikova.

Film adaptation

An adaptation starring Anna Kendrick and Jeremy Jordan was directed by P.S. I Love You director Richard LaGravenese. The film premiered at the 2014 Toronto International Film Festival and had a limited release in theatres in 2015. It received mixed to positive reviews; the review aggregator website Rotten Tomatoes reported a 60% approval rating.

References

External links

The Last Five Years at the Internet Off-Broadway Database.  (archive)
New York Times review, March 4, 2002
Curtain Up review, March 2002
The Last Five Years at the Music Theatre International website

2001 musicals
Off-Broadway musicals
One-act musicals
Original musicals
Sung-through musicals
Two-handers
Musicals by Jason Robert Brown
Musicals inspired by real-life events